Statistics of Ramazan Veteran's Cup in the 2018 season.

Group stage
From each group, the top two teams will be advanced for the Semi-finals.

All times listed are Maldives Standard Time.

Group A

Group B

Semi-finals

Final

Awards

References

External links

Maldivian Second Division Football Tournament seasons
Maldives
Maldives
2